St Helen's with its  single platform was the only intermediate stop on the  branch line that connected Brading to the coast at Bembridge.

History
Opened in 1882, when the area was the Island's main port, it ran with ever-dwindling passengers until 1953. Pomeroy described the station thus: An imposing structure with tall chimneys and elegant dormers, particularly pleasing to the eye.

Train Ferry
From 1885 to 1888 St Helens was the Isle of Wight end of a Freight only Train ferry Service. This connected the Isle of Wight Rail Network with Mainland Great Britain's network at Langston railway station, using the Former Firth of Tay Train Ferry TF Carrier.

Stationmasters
In 1931 the stationmaster, Thomas George Clayton Weeks was sentenced to 18 months’ imprisonment for theft and forgery of receipts. He had created fictitious wage sheets for casual workers at the Southern Railway quay and robbed the company of around £3,000 in four years. It was reported that he had been spending about £5 per week on drink, and made presents of joints of beef to various villagers, spending over £400 at one butchers shop in twelve months.

William Weeks from 1882 (formerly station master at Wroxall)
George Wetherick ca. 1897 ca. 1910
Thomas George Weeks until 1931
Charles Willcocks ca. 1935

See also 

 List of closed railway stations in Britain

References

External links
St Helens on Subterranea Britannica

Disused railway stations on the Isle of Wight
Former Isle of Wight Railway stations
Railway stations in Great Britain opened in 1882
Railway stations in Great Britain closed in 1953